Nils Wichstrøm (5 September 1848 – 1 December 1879) was a Norwegian actor and stage instructor. He joined the Bergen theatre Den Nationale Scene from its start in 1876, and was the theatre's first stage instructor and artistic leader from 1876. He died from appendicitis in 1879.

References

Further reading

1848 births
1879 deaths
Deaths from appendicitis
Male actors from Oslo
Norwegian theatre directors
19th-century Norwegian male actors